was a town located in Saihaku District, Tottori Prefecture, Japan.

As of 2003, the town had an estimated population of 7,392 and a density of 164.19 persons per km². The total area was 45.02 km².

On March 28, 2005, Nawa, along with the town of Nakayama (also from Saihaku District), was merged into the expanded town of Daisen.

External links
 Daisen official website 

Dissolved municipalities of Tottori Prefecture
Daisen, Tottori